Sidingwa is a Gaupalika(Nepali: गाउपालिका ; gaupalika)(Formerly: village development committee) located in Taplejung District in the Mechi Zone of eastern Nepal. The local body was formed by merging seven VDCs namely limbudin, Kalikhola,Sadewa, Ankhop, Sablakhu, Mehele, Surumkhim. Currently, it has a total of 7 wards. The population of the rural municipality is 12,099 according to the data collected on 2017 Nepalese local elections.

Population 
As per 2017, Sidingwa hosts a population of 12,099 across a total area of 206 km2.

See also
Taplejung District

References

Rural municipalities in Koshi Province
Rural municipalities in Taplejung District
Rural municipalities of Nepal established in 2017